This is a list of vehicles marketed by the Buick division of General Motors, which currently operate in the U.S., Canada, Mexico and China.

Current models

Former models

Original models 

Notes

Global 
Rebadged models, developed in or outside North America:

Notes

Concept models 

 Avenir (2015) 
 Avista (2016)
 Bengal (2001)
 Blackhawk (2003)
 Bolero (1990)
 Centieme (2003)
 Century Cruiser (1969)
 LeSabre  (1951)
 Park Avenue Essence (1989)
 Riviera Concept (2007)
 Riviera Concept II (2013)
 Silver Arrow (1963)
 Velite (2004) 
 Wildcat EV (2022) 
 XP2000 (1995) 
 XP-300 (1951) 
 Y-Job (1938) 

Notes

References

Buick concept vehicles
Buick vehicles
Buick